Panopeus occidentalis, the furrowed mud crab, is a true crab belonging to the infraorder Brachyura. It is native to the western Atlantic Ocean, its range extending from North Carolina to Florida, the Caribbean Sea, the Gulf of Mexico, the West Indies, the Guianas and Brazil, as far south as the state of Santa Catarina.

References

Xanthoidea
Crustaceans of the Atlantic Ocean
Crustaceans described in 1857